A Unilateral palmoplantar verrucous nevus is a cutaneous condition that has features of pachyonychia congenita.

See also 
 Unilateral nevoid telangiectasia
 List of cutaneous conditions

References 

Epidermal nevi, neoplasms, and cysts